Edayathankudi is a village in the Ariyalur taluk of Ariyalur district, Tamil Nadu, India.

Demographics 

 census, Edayathankudi had a total population of 2008 with 1031 males and 977 females.

References 

Villages in Ariyalur district